Audience is the first album by British art rock band Audience, released in 1969. It was deleted shortly after its release and is now collectable in its original vinyl version. The band was soon afterwards signed by Tony Stratton-Smith to Charisma Records.

Track listing
Unless noted, all tracks credited to Howard Werth and Trevor Williams.

Side one
 "Banquet" - 3:47
 "Poet" - 3:05
 "Waverley Stage Coach" (Williams) - 2:59
 "Riverboat Queen" - 2:57
 "Harlequin" - 2:35
 "Heaven Was an Island" - 4:18

Side two
 "Too Late I'm Gone" - 2:37
 "Maidens Cry" (Gemmell, Richardson, Werth, Williams)- 4:47
 "Pleasant Convalescence" - (Gemmell, Werth) - 2:30
 "Leave It Unsaid"
 "Man On Box" (Gemmell, Werth) 
 "House On the Hill"

Re-release bonus tracks
 "Paper Round"
 "The Going Song"
 "Troubles" (Werth)

Personnel
Howard Werth - electric classical guitar, vocals
Trevor Williams - bass
Keith Gemmell - tenor saxophone, clarinet, flute
Tony Connor - drums, vibes
Mike D'Abo - piano

Additional personnel
Chris Brough - producer
Andrew Price-Jackman - string arrangements on tracks A3, B1 & B3
Paragon Publicity - sleeve design

References

Polydor Records albums
1969 debut albums
Audience (band) albums
Albums recorded at Morgan Sound Studios